Acacia fuscaneura, commonly known as sooty wattle, is a tree belonging to the genus Acacia and the subgenus Juliflorae. It is native to arid areas of central Australia.

Description
The young branchlets are densely haired with the hairs obscuring ribs. It flowers in early summer between November and December producing solitary axillary inflorescences with long cylindrically shaped yellow flowerheads. The seed pods that form after flowering are dark brown in colour and can have a purplish tinge with seeds that are normally narrowly winged.
It is very similar in appearance to Acacia aneura var. aneura and also strongly resembles the more widespread Acacia paraneura.

Taxonomy
The species was first formally described by the botanists Bruce Maslin and J.E.Reid in 2012 as part of the work A taxonomic revision of Mulga (Acacia aneura and its close relatives: Fabaceae) in Western Australia as published in the journal Nuytsia. Two synonyms are known; Acacia aneura var. fuliginea and  Racosperma aneurum var. fuligineum.

Distribution
In Western Australia it is found scattered across a large area in the Wheatbelt, Mid West and Goldfields regions of Western Australia. It is also found through interior areas of South Australia.

See also
 List of Acacia species

References

fuscaneura
Acacias of Western Australia
Flora of South Australia
Plants described in 2012
Taxa named by Bruce Maslin